= Big Whopper mine =

Tantalum and lithium Mine in Ontario

- Location within Ontario

Location
- Location: Ontario, Canada; 50°15′45″N 94°33′51.98″W

Production
- Products: Tantalum

The Big Whopper mine is a large mine located at Separation Lake, in Ontario, Canada. Big Whopper represents one of the largest tantalum reserves in Canada having estimated reserves of 13.8 million tonnes of ore grading 0.007% tantalum and 1.34% lithium.
